is a Japanese author. He is a member of the Mystery Writers of Japan and the Honkaku Mystery Writers Club of Japan.

Biography 
He graduated from Kyoto University with a degree in Economics. After working for a life insurance company for several years, Kishi started his writing career as a freelancer. He has twice won the Japan Horror Novel Award and has achieved a bestselling status in Japan with multiple works adapted to the screen. The Crimson Labyrinth marks his American debut.

Bibliography

Kei Enomoto series
 Novel
 , 2004
 Short story collections
 , 2008
 , 2011

Standalone novels
 , 1996
 , 1997
 , 1998
 , released in 1999 in Japan, published in English in 2006 by Vertical
 , 1999
 , 2008
 , 2010
 , 2011
 , 2013
 , 2020
 , 2020

Adaptations
Japanese films
Kuroi Ie (1999)
 Kuori le (1999)
 Isola: Persona 13 (2000)
 The Blue Light (2003)
 Lesson of the Evil (2012) (Aku no Kyōten)

South Korean film
 Black House (2007) (Kuroi Ie)

Anime
 From the New World (2012)
Hong Kong film

Legally Declared Dead 死因無可疑 (based on Black House) (2019)

 Manga
 Isola: Persona 13 (1999)
 The Blue Flame (2003)
 From the New World (2012-2014)
 Lesson of the Evil (2012-2015)
 The Crimson Labyrinth (2013-2014)
 Chirping of Angels (2020)

Awards 
 1996 - 3th Japanese Horror Novel Award (ja): Isola 
 1997 - 4th Japanese Horror Novel Award (ja): Kuroi Ie (Black House)
 2000 - 21st Yoshikawa Eiji Award Candidate (ja) and  13th Yamamoto Shugōrō Award Candidate (ja): Ao no Honō (The Blue Flame)
 2005 - 58th Mystery Writers of Japan Award for Best Novel: Garasu no Hammā (The Glass Hammer )
 2008 - Japan SF Award (ja) and 30th Yoshikawa Eiji Award Candidate (ja) : From the New World
 2010 - Yamada Futaro Award : Aku no Kyōten (Lesson of the Evil )
 2011 - The Best Japanese Crime Fiction of the Year (Kono Mystery ga Sugoi! 2011): Aku no Kyōten (Lesson of the Evil)

References

External links 
Yusuke Kishi at J'Lit Books from Japan 
Profile at Vertical, Inc. 
Powell's Books Biography
Google Books List of Works

1959 births
Living people
Japanese detective fiction writers
Japanese mystery writers
Japanese crime fiction writers
Mystery Writers of Japan Award winners
Japanese horror writers
Japanese science fiction writers
People from Osaka
Kyoto University alumni